Grizano is a village in the Trikala regional unit, Greece, part of the Farkadona municipality. In 2011 its population was 1,290. With most of Thessaly, it joined Greece in 1881.

Population

See also
List of settlements in the Trikala regional unit

References

Populated places in Trikala (regional unit)